"Back in the Day" is a 2003 hip-hop song by Missy "Misdemeanor" Elliott, featuring guest vocals from Jay-Z and Elliott protégé Tweet. The song appears on her 2002 album Under Construction and was at one time planned for release as a single.  It peaked at #86 on Billboard Hot R&B/Hip-Hop Singles & Tracks chart in 2003 before being scrapped as a single.

About the song
Produced by Elliott's main producer and longtime collaborator Timbaland, "Back in the Day" is an ode to the classic era of old school hip-hop, when the hip-hop culture was, Elliott sings, fun and peaceful, compared to the more violent scope of modern-day hip-hop. "Back in the day/hip-hop has changed", she sings. During the bridge of the song she even makes a point of referencing "Self-Destruction", a 1989 collaborative benefit single for peace featuring a number of that era's hip-hop stars. Incidentally, MC Lyte's verse from "Self-Destruction" is sampled on another of Under Construction'''s album tracks, "Funky Fresh Dressed".

Jay-Z contributes a rap verse in which he "creatively" references a number of hip-hop artists (for example, stating "I kill at will like solid water, dude", a reference to Ice Cube's 1990 EP Kill At Will). At one point during his verse, Jay-Z raps "so fuck Chuck Philips and Bill O'Reilly/if they try to stop hip-hop, we all gon' rally", a reference to two of hip-hop's most vocal critics.

"Back in the Day" references

Below is a list of old-school hip-hop people and items Elliott and Jay-Z namedrop in "Back in the Day":

Hip hop fashions
British Knights
Gold chains
Phat laces

Dances
Prep
Cabbage Patch

Hip hop artists
Salt-N-Pepa
Rakim
Run-D.M.C.
Big Daddy Kane
Heavy D
Slick Rick
MC Lyte
Raekwon
Ghostface Killah
Showbiz and A.G.
Dr. Dre
LL Cool J
Public Enemy
M.O.P
Tag Team
Ice Cube
The Notorious B.I.G.
2Pac
KRS-OneEPMDb

Personnel
 Lead Vocals by Missy "Misdemeanor" Elliott and Jay-Z
 Background Vocals by Tweet
 Whistle by Timbaland
 Written by Melissa Elliott, Timothy Mosley, and Shawn Carter
 Produced by Timbaland for Timbaland Productions; Co-produced by Missy "Misdemeanor" Elliott

Charts

References

2002 songs
Missy Elliott songs
Jay-Z songs
Hip hop soul songs
Songs about nostalgia
Song recordings produced by Timbaland
Songs written by Jay-Z
Songs written by Missy Elliott
Songs written by Timbaland